William Douglas Goodfellow  (23 July 1917 – 10 July 2014) was a prominent New Zealand businessman and philanthropist.

In the 1980 New Year Honours, Goodfellow was appointed an Officer of the Order of the British Empire, for services to the community. In 1994 he topped the NBR annual rich list as New Zealand's wealthiest person. In 2010, Goodfellow was inducted into the New Zealand Business Hall of Fame.

References

External links
The Goodfellow Family at saintkentigern.com

1917 births
2014 deaths
New Zealand businesspeople
New Zealand philanthropists
New Zealand Officers of the Order of the British Empire
20th-century philanthropists